Samuel Compton Swire (born March 1980) is a British businessman.

Early life
Samuel Compton Swire was born in March 1980. His late father, Sir Adrian Swire, was a billionaire heir and former chairman of the Swire Group. His mother is Lady Judith Compton. He has a brother, Merlin Swire.

He graduated from University College, Oxford in 2003, where he studied history.

Career
Swire started his career at the family business, the Swire Group, in 2003. He has worked for them in Hong Kong, Singapore, China, Sri Lanka and London.

Swire has served on the board of directors of John Swire & Sons Ltd since January 2015. In 2019, Swire became chairman of Swire Shipping and Swire Bulk. From 2015 to 2023 he was a director of both Swire Pacific and Cathay Pacific Airways.

Swire is chairman of the Swire Charitable Trust and the Swire Chinese Language Foundation. He has been a trustee of The Mission to Seafarers since 2016.

References

Living people
British people of English descent
Alumni of University College, Oxford
English businesspeople
British corporate directors
Cathay Pacific
Samuel
1980 births